The Triberg Waterfalls are waterfalls near Triberg in the Black Forest in Baden-Württemberg (Germany). With a descent of 163 m, it is one of the highest waterfalls in Germany and a landmark in the Black Forest region. 

Above Triberg, in the midst of Black Forest, the Gutach river plunges over seven major steps from a gently undulated high plain into a rocky V-shaped valley.

In Triberg, at the bottom of the falls, the deep valley forms a basin just wide enough for a small town. The steep basin and the waterfalls were initially formed by two faults in the granite and then by glaciers during several glaciations of the Pleistocene.

Triberg with its waterfalls is a popular tourist spot, attracting a large number of both domestic and foreign tourists each year. The upper part of the falls is less spectacular. Here the water is used by a small and very old hydroelectric power plant.

External links 
Information about the waterfalls on the website of the community of Triberg (German)
Photos of Triberg Waterfalls (Spanish)

Photo gallery

References 

Waterfalls of Germany
Black Forest
Geography of the Black Forest
WTriberg
Landforms of Baden-Württemberg
Schwarzwald-Baar-Kreis